Agropyron fragile (Siberian wheatgrass) is a species of plant in the family Poaceae.

External links

Agropyron fragile 

USDA Plants Profile: Agropyron fragile

Pooideae
Flora of Siberia
Flora of Europe
Bunchgrasses of Europe